Indi-Illi Park Historic District is a national historic district located at Hammond, Lake County, Indiana.   The district encompasses 93 contributing buildings in an exclusively residential section of Hammond. It developed between about 1923 and 1940, and includes notable example of Colonial Revival, Tudor Revival, Classical Revival, Bungalow / American Craftsman, and eclectic styles of residential architecture.

It was listed in the National Register of Historic Places in 2012.

References

Historic districts on the National Register of Historic Places in Indiana
Colonial Revival architecture in Indiana
Tudor Revival architecture in Indiana
Neoclassical architecture in Indiana
Historic districts in Hammond, Indiana
National Register of Historic Places in Lake County, Indiana